Francisco D'Souza (born 23 August 1968) is an Indian-American entrepreneur and businessman, who is the former CEO and Vice Chairman of Cognizant — a Fortune 200 global professional services company – co-founded the NASDAQ-100 company in 1994. He succeeded Lakshmi Narayanan as the CEO in 2007 and in 2018 was appointed Vice Chairman, while continuing his role as the CEO till 1 April 2019.

Biography 
Francisco was born in Nairobi, Kenya as the son of Placido D'Souza—an Indian Foreign Services officer and diplomat who grew up in Pune— and Sushila. He has his roots in Anjuna, Goa. He spent his childhood in 11 countries and went on to do a Bachelor of Business Administration from University of East Asia Macau and a Master of Business Administration from Carnegie Mellon University. He has three sisters, Jacinta, Lucia and Maria.

Career 
After his graduation from Tepper School of Business (Carnegie Mellon University), Francisco joined Dun & Bradstreet as a management associate in 1992. Cognizant began in 1994 as an in-house project of Dun & Bradstreet, led by Francisco. During the years from 1996, he held various leadership roles at Cognizant. He was elevated to CEO and joined the Board of Directors of Cognizant in January 2007, and promoted to the Vice Chairman of the Board in June 2018.

In 2013, Francisco joined the board of General Electric as its youngest director.

He also serves on the Board of Trustees of Carnegie Mellon University and as Co-Chairman of the Board of Trustees of the New York Hall of Science.  

Francisco is a member of the World Economic Forum and the 2019 Chairman of the World Economic Forum's IT Governors Steering Committee. He sits on the Board of Directors of The National Medal of Honor Museum.

In November 2019, MongoDB Appoints Francisco D'Souza to the board of directors.

In July 2020, Banco Santander has appointed Francisco to top tier executive position in support of its digital transformation strategy.

Awards and honors 

 2005 - The Economic Times Entrepreneur Award
 2009 - named among "America's Best CEOs" by Institutional Investor magazine
 2013 - named among "100 CEO Leaders in STEM" by STEMconnector
 2013 - Recognized as the Best CEO, Forbes India
 2014 - "Newsmaker of the Year" by The Financial Express
 2017 - #10 on Fortune Businessperson of the Year

References

External links 
 Profile at Forbes.com 
 Francisco D'Souza: Unique strategies for a flat world (Article at LiveMint.com/Wall St. Journal)

Living people
American people of Goan descent
American people of Indian descent
Tepper School of Business alumni
1968 births
University of Macau alumni
American technology chief executives